Gregory Gustina (born August 12, 1973, on Curaçao, Netherlands Antilles) is a Dutch professional baseball pitcher with Sparta-Feyenoord of the Honkbal Hoofdklasse. In 2010, Gustina led the league in innings pitched. In 2006, he appeared with the Netherlands national baseball team at the 2006 World Baseball Classic. He represented the Netherlands Antilles at the 1995 Pan American Games.

References

1973 births
Baseball players at the 1995 Pan American Games
Pan American Games competitors for the Netherlands Antilles
2006 World Baseball Classic players
Baseball pitchers
Curaçao baseball players
Dutch people of Curaçao descent
Living people